The Surgut-1 Power Station is a gas-fired power station located in Surgut, Russia. The facility began operations in February 1972.

On 28 June 2011, a gas explosion occurred at the power station. At least 12 people were injured.

See also 

 List of natural gas power stations
 List of largest power stations in the world
 List of power stations in Russia
 Surgut-2 Power Station

References

External links 
 

Natural gas-fired power stations in Russia
Power stations built in the Soviet Union